Jibril Isa Diso is the First Blind professor in Nigeria from Kano State, academician and the former adviser to Governor of Kano State Ibrahim Shekarau

Early life and education 
Jibril was born in Diso quarters of Gwale Local Government Area, of Kano State. Jibril Started his education in 1962 where he finishes his primary education in 1969, he also attended Gindiri Blinds Secondary School, Plateau State between 1979, in 1984 Bayero University established the Department of Special Education because of Jibril and admit him as a first student in the department, Jibril obtained his PhD in Special Education in London University of Birmingham in 1991.

Career
Jibril started his career at Tudun Maliki School for special needy Kano. Jibril Joined the Department of Special Education, Bayero University Kano in 1994 where he become the first visually impaired professor in Nigeria in the year 2019. Jibril has more than 10 publications

References

1955 births
Living people
Academic staff of Bayero University Kano
Nigerian blind people
Blind academics